The Riding Comet or Ridin' Comet is a 1925 American silent Western film directed by Ben F. Wilson and starring Yakima Canutt, Dorothy Wood, and Robert D. Walker.

Plot
As described in a film magazine review, because he is trying to hold up an irrigation project and also "butt in" on Max Underly's girl, the latter and his gang try to frame Slim Ranthers. He is lured to a ranch at night and shot in the arm. Austin Livingston, the irrigation engineer, tries to have him branded as a cattle thief, but Slim foils all their plans. He even aids Bess Livingston in getting help when her brother is injured by a cougar in time to save his life.

Cast

References

Bibliography
 Langman, Larry. A Guide to Silent Westerns. Greenwood Publishing Group, 1992.

External links
 

1925 films
1925 Western (genre) films
1920s English-language films
Films directed by Ben F. Wilson
American black-and-white films
Film Booking Offices of America films
Silent American Western (genre) films
1920s American films